Other Voices, Other Rooms is the debut album by alternative rock band, The Getaway Plan. The Australian band released the album with Boomtown Records on 9 February 2008.

Production details
The album was produced in Florida, United States (US), by James Paul Wisner, who has previously worked with Underoath, The Academy Is... and Dashboard Confessional.

Release details
Three songs from the album were released as singles. The first was "Streetlight", released on 3 November 2007. Boomtown and Shock Records released the second and third singles from the album, "Where the City Meets the Sea"  and "Shadows", on 15 March 2008 and 8 November 2008, respectively.

Track listings

Tour edition bonus DVD

Personnel
 Matthew Wright – Lead vocals, piano, rhythm guitar
 Clint Splattering – Lead guitar
 Dave Anderson – Bass guitar
 Aaron Barnett – Drums, percussion

Charts
The album debuted at #14 on the ARIA charts, before falling to #31. It spent a further two weeks in the chart

End of year charts

Release history

References

2008 albums
The Getaway Plan albums
Albums produced by James Paul Wisner